Emmy Köhler, born 22 May 1858 in Stockholm, Sweden, died 2 February 1925 in Fresta, Sweden was a Swedish hymnwriter and writer. Among of her more famous works is the Christmas carol Nu tändas tusen juleljus and the music for the children's Christmas song Raska fötter springa tripp, tripp, tripp ("Liten julvisa"), the later with lyrics by Sigrid Sköldberg-Pettersson.

References

Further reading

1858 births
1925 deaths
Swedish Christian hymnwriters
Swedish women writers
Swedish-language writers
Women hymnwriters